Jesús Díaz Palacio (born October 16, 1954) is a retired Colombian football referee. He is known for having refereed two matches in the 1986 FIFA World Cup in Mexico. One of the matches, Iraq versus Belgium, caused controversy as Díaz gave a yellow card to Iraq's Basil Gorgis in a case of mistaken identity (the yellow was supposed to be given to Ghanim Oraibi) while the score was 2–0 to Belgium. Gorgis sarcastically applauded Díaz's incorrect decision which led to Gorgis getting sent off and Iraq lost 2–1.

References

Profile

1954 births
Living people
Colombian football referees
FIFA World Cup referees
Copa América referees
1986 FIFA World Cup referees
Olympic football referees